PITCO Foods, formed by the merger of Pacific Groservice and Pittsburg Wholesale Grocers, operates a handful of members-only warehouse stores under the PITCO banner name across California in San Francisco, Sacramento, San Jose, and Oakland. The outlets stock more than 9,000 items, including Hispanic and Asian products, and cater to some 10,000 independently owned retailers and food service operators throughout the Central Valley and Northern California. Customers include supermarkets and convenience stores, drug stores, vending operations, restaurants, and caterers. In addition to various food items, the wholesaler stocks tobacco, janitorial supplies, housewares, health and beauty aids, and auto supplies.

References

Companies based in San Jose, California
Wholesalers of the United States